The Zesłańców Syberyjskich Roundabout (literally: Siberian Exiles) is a roundabout in western Warsaw's Ochota district, named after Poles who have been exiled to Siberia.

The following streets meet at Sybirak Roundabout:
 on the east, Jerusalem Avenue (aleje Jerozolimskie);
 on the west, Jerusalem Avenue (aleje Jerozolimskie);
 on the north, Millennial Primate Avenue (aleja Prymasa Tysiąclecia);
 on the south, 1920 Battle of Warsaw Street (ulica Bitwy Warszawskiej 1920 roku).

Streets in Warsaw